The First Congregational Church in Rapid City, South Dakota, also known as The Lord's Chapel, is a historic church at 715 Kansas City Street.  It was built in 1914 and was added to the National Register in 1984.

References

Congregational churches in South Dakota
20th-century churches in the United States
Churches on the National Register of Historic Places in South Dakota
Renaissance Revival architecture in South Dakota
Churches completed in 1914
Buildings and structures in Rapid City, South Dakota
Churches in Pennington County, South Dakota
National Register of Historic Places in Pennington County, South Dakota
1914 establishments in South Dakota